Charleville GAA club is a Gaelic football and hurling club based in the town of Charleville, County Cork, Ireland. The club is affiliated with the Cork GAA county board and the Avondhu divisional board.

History
Charleville or Rathluirc GAA club was founded in 1888, and was drawn against Ballyhea in the championship that year. In 1914 the club had its first success winning the county Middle Grade (Intermediate) hurling championship. In the early 1930s, after experiencing some lean years, the club decided to run street leagues for the whole parish initially at adult level and later at minor level. These games were often fiercely contested as the pride of a particular part of the town was at stake. In 1937 a separate club named Seán Clarach was set up to oversee the minor age group. The club won its first North Cork Junior hurling title in 1945 beating Ballyhooly in the final, and lost to the Duhallow champions in the county semi-final, played at Kanturk. A decision was taken after winning the North Cork junior hurling championship in 1945 to enter in the Intermediate grade for the following year. This led to the club's greatest achievement on the field winning the Cork Intermediate Hurling Championship in 1946 and again in 1947. The club played in the Cork Senior Hurling Championship from 1948 to 1952 and reached one county semi-final (1950). They played Intermediate from 1953 onwards losing the county final to Glen Rovers in 1958. They reverted to the Junior grade in 1960 and won the Avondhu title in 1970, beating Liscarroll.

The 2010s has been the club's most successful to date. In 2011 they won the North Cork Junior A Hurling Championship and later added the Cork Junior Hurling Championship for the first time, they would then go on to win the Munster Junior Club Hurling Championship. The lost out in the All-Ireland Junior Club Hurling Championship in Croke Park to St. Patrick's, Ballyraggett by a point in 2012.

After losing in the 2014 final they won the 2015 Cork Intermediate Hurling Championship for the fourth time and first since 1946. This was followed up with a first ever Cork Premier Intermediate Hurling Championship in 2018, seeing the club back in the senior grade for the first time since 1952. They would later add the Munster Intermediate Club Hurling Championship overcoming Kilmaley. They lost out in the All-Ireland Intermediate Club Hurling Championship to Oranmore-Maree in Croke Park in 2019.

The clubs return to the 2019 Cork Senior Hurling Championship seen them reach Round 3 where they lost by a point after extra time to Glen Rovers.

In 2020 the club entered the new Cork Senior A Hurling Championship. The championship was scheduled to begin in April 2020, however, it was postponed indefinitely due to the impact of the COVID-19 pandemic on Gaelic games. When he restarted wins over Bandon, Fermoy and Mallow seen them top their group. A semi-final win over Kanturk seen them qualify for the final where they faced Fr. O'Neill's. It was a clash of the previous two All-Ireland Intermediate Club Hurling Championship finalists. At the end of a high scoring game Charleville  were crowned 2020 Cork Senior A Hurling Championship winners on a 1-23 to 4-13 scoreline.

Honours
 All-Ireland Junior Club Hurling Championship Runners-up 2012
 All-Ireland Intermediate Club Hurling Championship Runners-up 2019
 Munster Intermediate Club Hurling Championship Winners (1) 2018
 Munster Junior Club Hurling Championship Winner (1) 2011
 Cork Senior A Hurling Championship Winners (1) 2020
 Cork Premier Intermediate Hurling Championship Winners (1) 2018
 Cork Intermediate Hurling Championship Winners (4) 1914, 1946, 1947, 2015  Runners-Up 2014
 Cork Junior Hurling Championship Winners (1) 2011  Runners-Up 1974, 2001, 2007
 Cork Junior B Football Championship Winners (2) 1998, 2013  Runners-Up 2010, 2011
 Cork Under-21 Football Championship Runners-Up 1998
 Cork Under-21 B Football Championship (1)  2018
 Cork Minor Hurling Championship (0) Runners-Up 1937, 1938 (as Seán Clárach's)
 Cork Minor A Hurling Championship Winners (2) 1994, 2010 (Runners-up 2022)
 North Cork Junior A Hurling Championship Winners (9) 1945, 1970, 1974, 1986, 2001, 2002, 2007, 2008, 2011 Runners-Up 1927, 1973, 1977, 1983, 1984, 1995, 1998, 2006
 North Cork Junior A Football Championship Winners 2018  Runners-Up 1926, 1934, 1936, 1937, 2015, 2020
 North Cork Under-21 Hurling Championship Winners (4) 2011, 2016, 2017, 2019

Notable players

 Darragh Fitzgibbon
 Billy Calligan

References

External sources
 Charleville GAA club website

Hurling clubs in County Cork
Gaelic football clubs in County Cork
Gaelic games clubs in County Cork